Yu Guangzhou (born January 1953) is a retired politician of the People's Republic of China. He served as Minister of the General Administration of Customs from April 2011 to March 2018. Prior to that, he served as Mayor of Wuxi (1993–1997) and Xuzhou (1997–2000) in Jiangsu province, Vice Governor of Jiangsu (2000–2001), Vice Minister of Commerce (2003–2008), and Vice Communist Party Chief of Fujian province (2009–2011).

Yu was a member of the 18th Central Committee of the Communist Party of China.

References

Living people
1953 births
Chinese Communist Party politicians from Jiangsu
People's Republic of China politicians from Jiangsu
Political office-holders in Jiangsu
Political office-holders in Fujian
Government ministers of the People's Republic of China
Mayors of Wuxi
Mayors of Xuzhou
Vice-governors of Jiangsu
Members of the 18th Central Committee of the Chinese Communist Party